Putian or Putien (Putian dialect: Pó-chéng), also known as Puyang (莆阳) and Puxian (莆仙), historically known as Xinghua or Hing Hwa, is a prefecture-level city in eastern Fujian province, China. It borders Fuzhou City to the north, Quanzhou City to the south, and the Taiwan Strait's Xinghai Bay to the east. The Mulan River flows through the southern part of the city.

History
Putian was first founded as an administrative area in the year of 568 as a city county during the Chen dynasty.

Putian was later established as a military administered city in 979. Putian is known as the counterfeit sneaker capital with counterfeiters protected from internationally intellectual property law enforcement by the notoriously corrupt local courts.

Language
Puxian Min belonging to a dialect of the languages Min Chinese is spoken.

Economy
Putian has become an export base for Fujian products. The main industries are shoe-making, brewing, electronics, garments, fruits, vegetables, and machinery, electrical goods. In particular, the area is known for high-quality counterfeits of shoes and the domination of Chinese private healthcare.

Culture

Putian is known for Putian (Henghwa) cuisine, a unique style of cuisine that places a heavy emphasis on fresh seafood.  Duotou clams, locally harvested around the village of Duotou, are particularly well known.

Tourism

Meizhou Island, most famous for being the legendary birthplace of the goddess Mazu, is located closely offshore of Putian.
According to legends, Mazu in her earthly incarnation died on the seashore of Xianliang Harbor, in the coastal area of Putian, where Xianliang Mazu Temple hosts pilgrims from different Chinese provinces and from Taiwan, particularly for the ceremonies commemorating the goddess' death held in October. Because of its hosting "the most sacred places for Mazu believers," Putian is known as "Mazu's hometown."

Universities and colleges

Putian University
Meizhouwan Vocational Technology College

Climate

Administration
Putian's municipal executive, legislature and judiciary are in Chengxiang District. The municipal region comprises three other districts and one county:

Hanjiang District
Licheng District
Xiuyu District
Xianyou County

References

External links

Putian Government Website

 
Prefecture-level divisions of Fujian
Cities in Fujian